Marion Henery (n. Jenkins) (29 April 1910 to 15 September 2001) was a Communist activist and hunger marcher from Cambuslang in Scotland.

Early life and education 
Henery was the daughter of a stonemason, Robert Jenkins, and Mary Robertson, a farm servant. She was born on 29 April 1910 in Cambuslang, an area to the south of Glasgow and was the youngest of eight children.

She attended Socialist Sunday School in Cambuslang before, at the age of fourteen, leaving school to attend a course at Skerry College in Glasgow.

Career and campaigning 
Henery then took up work for a carpet manufacturer before she obtained a role at the United Mineworkers of Scotland. In 1931, aged only 21, she took up a full time role at the Young Communist League (Scotland) as an organiser.

A year later, she was one of the organisers of the women's hunger march which started in Lancashire, England and finished in London. From 1933-1934, she attended the International Lenin School in the Soviet Union, which was official training school operated in Moscow from May 1926 to 1938 and taught both academic courses and practical underground political techniques.

Following her marriage in 1935, she moved to Welwyn Garden City, England,  in order to obtain work before moving back to Scotland during the Second World War and staying at Auchinloch, near Kirkintilloch.

Postwar life 
In the 1950s, Henery was an active member of the Scottish Communist Workers Group (SWCG). Between 1956 and 1969, she organised weekend classes and schools for women.

During the mid 1960s, Henery worked as a secretary at Stobhill Hospital in the north of Glasgow, in the Geriatric Unit. During this time she was an active member of the National and Local Government Officers' Association (NALGO) trade union and campaigned for cervical cancer detection.

Personal life 
In 1935, Marion married Joe Henery, a miner, and the couple had three children together.

Later life and death 
During her retirement in later life, Henery became the Secretary of the Scottish Old Age Pensioners Campaign and was active working for the Campaign for Nuclear Disarmament (CND).

Henery died on 15 September 2001 in Coatbridge.

References 

1910 births
2001 deaths
Scottish women activists
Scottish communists
Scottish trade unionists